Holzhauser is a German language habitational surname for someone from any of numerous places called Holzhausen. Notable people with the name include:
 Bartholomew Holzhauser (1613–1658), German priest
 Raphael Holzhauser (born 1993), Austrian professional footballer

References 

German-language surnames
German toponymic surnames